Gisulf is the name of several figures in the political history of Italy:

Gisulf of Spoleto
Gisulf I of Friuli
Gisulf II of Friuli
Gisulf I of Benevento
Gisulf II of Benevento
Gisulf I of Salerno
Gisulf II of Salerno